Abhinav Apjit Bindra is an Indian Olympic gold medallist, retired sport shooter, and businessman. He is the first and one of only 2 Indians to win an Individual Olympic Gold Medal.  He is the first Indian to have held concurrently the world and Olympic titles for the men's 10-meter air rifle event, having earned those honors at the 2008 Summer Olympics and the 2006 ISSF World Shooting Championships. Bindra has also won seven medals at the Commonwealth Games and three medals at the Asian Games.

With more than 150 medals in his 22-year career, he is the recipient of the Padma Bhushan from the Government of India and is one of the top influencers of sport policy in the country.

At the 2016 Summer Olympics in Rio de Janeiro, Bindra finished fourth in the finals of the 10-meter air rifle event. He also served as a goodwill ambassador for the Rio 2016 Olympics Indian contingent, having been appointed to that post by the Indian Olympics Association (IOA). On September 5, 2016, he announced his retirement.

Bindra's primary outreach to Indian sports is through the Abhinav Bindra Foundation, a non-profit organization that works to integrate sports, science, and technology into Indian sports and encourage high-performance physical training.

In 2018, Abhinav was bestowed with the prestigious Blue Cross, the ISSF's highest honor.

Bindra is also currently a member of the IOC Athletes' Commission.

Career

Early years

Bindra was born in Dehradun in Uttarakhand, to a Punjabi family. From his mother's side, he is a 5th generation direct descendant of Hari Singh Nalwa, the Commander-in-Chief of the Sikh Khalsa Army.  He was educated at the Doon School in Dehradun and at St. Stephen's School in Chandigarh. He studied business administration at the University of Colorado Boulder. Determined to train with the best possible facilities, which were then not available in India, he would train for prolonged periods in Germany.

Notable international performances
At the age of 15, Bindra was the youngest participant in the 1998 Commonwealth Games. He was also the youngest Indian participant at the 2000 Summer Olympics in Sydney. At the 2000 Olympics, he achieved a score of 590, placing him 11th in the qualification round. With that score, he was not able to qualify for the finals. He was also honored with the Arjuna Award that year.

In international competitions, he won his first medal, a bronze, at the 2001 Munich World Cup with a new junior world record score of 597/600. He won six gold medals at various international meets that year and received the prestigious Major Dhyan Chand Khel Ratna award, India's highest sports award.

In the air rifle event at the 2002 Commonwealth Games in Manchester, he finished with gold in the pairs event and silver in the individual event.

In the 2004 Summer Olympics in Athens, he established a new Olympic record but did not win a medal. He scored 597 in the qualification round and placed third, preceded by Qinan Zhu (599, a new Olympic record) and Li Jie (598). In the finals, Abhinav finished with 97.6 points, last in the field of eight; he was the only player with less than 100 points and dropped to the seventh position.

After these successes, a severe back injury incapacitated him and he was unable to lift a rifle for a year, interrupting his preparation for the 2008 Summer Olympics. Bindra returned to compete and won the title at the 2006 ISSF World Shooting Championships with a score of 699.1, qualifying him for the 2008 Summer Olympics.

At the 2008 Summer Olympics in Beijing, Bindra titled in the men's 10-meter air rifle event, shooting a total of 700.5. He scored 596 in the qualifying round, finishing fourth, and outscored all other shooters in the finals with a round of 104.5. In the finals, he started with a shot of 10.7, and all others never dipped below 10.0. Bindra was tied with Henri Häkkinen heading into his final shot. Bindra scored his highest of the finals – 10.8 – while Hakkinen shot 9.7 to settle for the bronze medal.

At the 2010 Commonwealth Games in New Delhi, Bindra was honored as the national flag-bearer at the opening ceremony. He also was given the honor of taking the athletes' oath on behalf of the 6,700 participants from 71 countries and territories. Bindra, along with Gagan Narang, shot in unison to set a games record of 1,193 points in the 10-meter air rifle pairs event for men to win India's inaugural gold medal at the 19th Commonwealth Games. He brought home a silver medal in the individual event.

Bindra won the gold medal in the men's 10-meter air rifle event at the 12th Asian Shooting Championships, held in Doha, Qatar.

He lost in the qualification round at the 2012 Summer Olympics in London, finishing in the 16th place with a score of 594.

In the 2014 Commonwealth Games in Glasgow, Bindra again won gold in the men's 10-meter air rifle singles event.

At the 2016 Summer Olympics in Rio de Janeiro, he came fourth in the men's 10-meter air rifle singles event after losing a shoot-off for the top 3 to Serhiy Kulish, who eventually won the silver medal.

Business career
Bindra has a bachelor's degree in business administration from the University of Colorado. Bindra is the CEO of Abhinav Futuristics Private Limited, an organization that works to bring science and technology into the sport and healthcare sectors. With ABTP, a group of sports science and advanced physical medicine and rehabilitation (PMR) centers, the organization has served more than 5,000 athletes and medical patients. Under the Abhinav Bindra Foundation, a non-profit initiative, athletes are provided access to the latest sports technology and high-performance physical training for free. Many athletes from sports such as swimming, badminton, boxing, and para-athletics have benefited from the foundation's various programs. In 2020, he launched the Abhinav Bindra Sports Medicine and Research Institute at Bhubaneswar with the mission of bringing Global Best Practice to the Indian Healthcare and Sports Medicine Sector.

Since his retirement, Bindra has been involved with the TOP Scheme, one of India's most significant policies for athlete development. He has also been a part of the ISSF and IOC Athlete Commissions, where he has worked for the development of athletes through mental health, financial stability, and entrepreneurship initiatives. Bindra's net worth is estimated to be around $10 million.

Summer Olympics

Personal life
Harper Sport published Bindra's autobiography, A Shot at History: My Obsessive Journey to Olympic Gold, which he co-authored with sportswriter Rohit Brijnath in October 2011. It was formally released by Union Sports Minister Ajay Maken on October 27, 2011, at a function in New Delhi.  The book received positive reviews, and Harshvardhan Kapoor has been cast for the lead role in a future biopic based on the memoir.

Awards and accolades 

 2000 – Arjuna award
 2002 – Major Dhyan Chand Khel Ratna (India's highest sports award)
 2008 − Honorary doctorate (D.Litt) from SRM University
 2009 – Padma Bhushan
 2011 – Made an honorary lieutenant colonel by the Indian Territorial Army
 2018 – Blue Cross, highest shooting honor by International Shooting Sport Federation
 2019 – Honorary doctorate (DPhil) from Kaziranga University
Awards for 2008 Olympic gold medal
  by Mittal Champions Trust
  cash prize from the Indian Central Government
  cash prize by the state government of Haryana
  cash prize by the Board of Control for Cricket in India
  cash prize by the Steel Ministry of India
  cash prize by the state government of Bihar. The Patna Indoor Stadium will be renamed after Bindra.
  prize by the state government of Karnataka
  cash prize by S. Amolak Singh Gakhal, chairman, Gold's Gym
  cash prize by the chief minister of Maharashtra state
  cash prize by the state government of Orissa
  cash prize by government of Tamil Nadu
  cash prize by the state government of Chhattisgarh
  cash prize by the state government of Madhya Pradesh
 A free lifetime railway pass by the Railway Ministry of India
 A gold medal by the state government of Kerala
  cash award by Pune Municipal Corporation

Bibliography

See also 
Sport in India – Overview of sports in India 
Shooting sports in India
Shooting at the Summer Olympics

References

Further reading

External links 

 
 
 
 
 
 

Living people
1982 births
Sport shooters from Uttarakhand
Recipients of the Arjuna Award
Recipients of the Khel Ratna Award
Indian male sport shooters
ISSF rifle shooters
Commonwealth Games gold medallists for India
Commonwealth Games silver medallists for India
Commonwealth Games bronze medallists for India
Olympic gold medalists for India
Olympic shooters of India
University of Colorado alumni
Recipients of the Padma Bhushan in sports
Shooters at the 2010 Commonwealth Games
Asian Games medalists in shooting
Olympic medalists in shooting
Shooters at the 2000 Summer Olympics
Shooters at the 2004 Summer Olympics
Shooters at the 2008 Summer Olympics
Shooters at the 2012 Summer Olympics
Shooters at the 2016 Summer Olympics
The Doon School alumni
Indian autobiographers
Medalists at the 2008 Summer Olympics
Shooters at the 2002 Asian Games
Shooters at the 2010 Asian Games
Shooters at the 2014 Asian Games
Asian Games silver medalists for India
Asian Games bronze medalists for India
Commonwealth Games medallists in shooting
Medalists at the 2010 Asian Games
Medalists at the 2014 Asian Games
Sport shooters from Punjab, India
Medallists at the 2010 Commonwealth Games